Champteussé-sur-Baconne is a former commune in the Maine-et-Loire department of western France. On 1 January 2016, it was merged into the new commune of Chenillé-Champteussé.

See also
Communes of the Maine-et-Loire department

References

Champteussesurbaconne